Roberto Vilches Ruisánchez (born 21 May 1999 in Mexico City) is a Mexican high jumper.

He won the title at 2018 World U20 Championships in Tampere  and the bronze medal at 2019 Pan American Games in Lima.

He won the Southeastern Conference indoor high jump championship in 2022.

References

External links
 
 Missouri Tigers bio

Mexican male high jumpers
Athletes (track and field) at the 2019 Pan American Games
Pan American Games bronze medalists for Mexico
Pan American Games medalists in athletics (track and field)
1999 births
Living people
World Athletics U20 Championships winners
Medalists at the 2019 Pan American Games
Missouri Tigers men's track and field athletes